Emory Wilbur "Ty" Helfrich (born October 9, 1890, in Pleasantville, New Jersey; died March 18, 1955, in Pleasantville, New Jersey) played second base for the 1915 Brooklyn Tip-Tops of the Federal League. That season was the only season he played Major League Baseball. Prior to his baseball career, he attended Lafayette College in Easton, Pennsylvania.  After baseball, he returned to South Jersey to become a high school coach.

References

Major League Baseball second basemen
Baseball players from New Jersey
1890 births
1955 deaths
Brooklyn Tip-Tops players
Lafayette Leopards baseball players
People from Pleasantville, New Jersey
Sportspeople from Atlantic County, New Jersey
Lowell Grays players
Newport News Shipbuilders players
Petersburg Goobers players
Worcester Busters players
Springfield Ponies players